Michael Jerome Oher (né Williams Jr.; born May 28, 1986) is a former American football offensive tackle who played in the National Football League (NFL) for eight seasons, primarily with the Baltimore Ravens. He played college football at the University of Mississippi, where he earned unanimous All-American honors, and was selected by the Ravens in the first round of the 2009 NFL Draft. He also played for the Tennessee Titans and Carolina Panthers.

Oher's life through his final year of high school and first year of college is one of the subjects of Michael Lewis' 2006 book, The Blind Side: Evolution of a Game, and was featured in the Academy Award-winning 2009 film The Blind Side.

Early life
Born Michael Jerome Williams, Jr., in Memphis, Tennessee, he was one of 12 children of Denise Oher. His mother suffered from alcoholism and crack cocaine addiction, and his father, Michael Jerome Williams, was frequently in prison. He received little attention or discipline during his childhood. He repeated first and second grades, and attended eleven schools during his first nine years as a student. He was placed in foster care at age seven, and alternated between living in various foster homes and periods of homelessness. Oher's father was a former cellmate of Denise Oher's brother and was murdered in prison when Oher was a senior in high school.

Oher played football during his freshman year at a public high school in Memphis. He applied for admission to Briarcrest Christian School at the suggestion of Tony Henderson, an auto mechanic with whom he was living temporarily. Henderson was enrolling his son at the school to fulfill the dying wish of the boy's grandmother and thought Oher might enroll as well. The school's football coach, Hugh Freeze, submitted Oher's school application to the headmaster, who agreed to accept him if Oher could complete a home study program first. He did not finish the program, but was admitted when the headmaster realized that his requirement had removed Oher from the public education system.

Coached by Freeze and Tim Long, Briarcrest's offensive line coach, Oher was named Division II (2A) Lineman of the Year in 2003, and First-team Tennessee All-State. Scout.com rated Oher a five-star recruit and the No. 5 offensive lineman prospect in the country. Before that season and for his prior 20 months at Briarcrest, Oher had been living with several foster families. In 2004, Leigh Anne and Sean Tuohy, a couple with a daughter and son attending Briarcrest, allowed Oher to live with them and eventually adopted him. The family began tending to his needs after becoming familiar with his difficult childhood. They also hired a tutor for him, who worked with him for 20 hours per week.

Oher earned two letters each in track and basketball. He averaged 22 points and 10 rebounds a game, earning All-State honors by helping lead the basketball team to a 27–6 record, winning the district championship as a senior. Oher was also a state runner-up in the discus as a senior.

Oher's initial low grades were a barrier to his acceptance to an NCAA program. He raised his 0.76 grade point average (GPA) to a 2.52 GPA by the end of his senior year so he could attend a Division I school, by enrolling in some 10-day online courses from Brigham Young University. Taking and passing the online courses allowed him to replace Ds and Fs earned in earlier school classes, such as English, with As earned via the Internet. This finally raised his graduating GPA above the required minimum.

At the conclusion of his senior season, Oher participated in the 2005 U.S. Army All-American Bowl.

College career
Though he received scholarship offers from Tennessee, LSU, Alabama, Auburn, and South Carolina, Oher ultimately decided to play for Ed Orgeron at the University of Mississippi, the alma mater of his guardians, Leigh Anne and Sean Tuohy. His decision to play for the Ole Miss Rebels football team sparked an investigation by the National Collegiate Athletic Association (NCAA). The first issue was that Oher's grade-point average (GPA) was still too low to meet the requirements for a Division I scholarship at the time of the offer from Ole Miss. That difficulty was corrected by graduation, when Oher completed online classes through Brigham Young University. The second issue was the Tuohys' preexisting relationship with the school and the fact that Ole Miss hired Freeze twenty days after Oher signed his letter of intent. Freeze asserted that his position with Ole Miss was not an example of quid pro quo for encouraging Oher to attend the school, but rather the result of his preexisting relationship with Ole Miss offensive coordinator Noel Mazzone. The NCAA did not close its case on its suspicions of collusion. However, it ruled that Ole Miss had committed no NCAA violations in its recruitment of Oher. Freeze was found guilty of secondary violations for contacting other Memphis-area recruits before joining the Ole Miss staff.

Oher started in ten games as a guard during his first season with the Ole Miss Rebels, becoming a first-team freshman All-American. After shifting to the position of left tackle for the 2006 season, he was named to various preseason All-Conference and All-American teams. Oher was named a second-team Southeastern Conference (SEC) offensive lineman after his sophomore season and a first-team SEC offensive lineman after his junior season. Oher was also successful academically at Ole Miss, and his tested IQ score increased 20 to 30 points between when he was measured in the public-school systems growing up and when he was measured in college.

On January 14, 2008, Oher declared that he would be entering the 2008 NFL Draft. However, two days later, he announced his withdrawal from the draft to return to Ole Miss for his senior season. After the 2008 season, Oher was recognized as a unanimous first-team All-American, made the honor roll for the second time (the first time being his sophomore year), and graduated with a degree in criminal justice in the spring of 2009.

College awards and honors

2005 First-team Freshman All-American
2005 First-team All-Quad Freshman Chrome [AQFC] Tackle Letius
2005 First-team SEC All-Freshman
2006 Second-team All-SEC
2007 First-team All-SEC
2008 First-team All-American
2008 First-team All-SEC
2008 Shug Jordan Award as the Southeast Offensive Lineman of the Year
2008 Colonel Earl "Red" Blaik Leadership-Scholarship Award
2008 Outland Trophy finalist
2008 Conerly Trophy finalist
2008 Lombardi Award semifinalist
2008 SEC Jacobs Blocking Trophy

Professional career
Already in 2008, Oher was projected as one of the top prospects for the 2009 NFL Draft. The Baltimore Ravens drafted Oher with the 23rd pick in the first round of the 2009 NFL Draft. The Ravens had acquired the pick from the New England Patriots in exchange for their first- and fifth-round draft picks. The Tuohy family was there to witness his draft day selection.

Baltimore Ravens

On July 30, 2009, Oher signed a five-year, $13.8 million contract with the Baltimore Ravens. He started the 2009 season as right tackle, but was moved to left tackle after an injury to lineman Jared Gaither. In week eight, he returned to right tackle.

Oher started every game in 2009, eleven at right tackle and five at left tackle. He played right tackle in his first post-season game, January 10, 2010, against the New England Patriots, and did not allow a single sack as the Ravens won 33–14.

Oher was second in the voting for Associated Press' NFL Offensive Rookie of the Year Award, with six votes.

Prior to the 2010 NFL season, Oher was moved to the left tackle position. During the 2011 pre-season, the Ravens announced that Oher would be moving back to the right side. On February 3, 2013, Oher won his first Super Bowl ring after the Ravens defeated the San Francisco 49ers 34–31 in Super Bowl XLVII.

Tennessee Titans

On March 14, 2014, Oher signed a four-year, $20 million contract with the Tennessee Titans. Oher started eleven games for the Titans, but he was placed on injured reserve on December 13 after missing the previous two games due to a toe injury. Pro Football Focus graded Oher as the 74th best tackle out of 78 for the 2014 season. The Titans released Oher on February 5, 2015.

Carolina Panthers
On March 6, 2015, Oher signed a two-year, $7 million contract with the Carolina Panthers. Dave Gettleman, the Panthers GM, said that Oher would be the Panthers' starting left tackle going into the season despite his struggles in Tennessee, saying "We did our homework on Michael, and we feel very strongly that he can be an answer for us. He'll be inserted at left tackle, and we'll go from there." Oher cited Cam Newton as an influential factor in his decision to sign with Carolina and Oher responded with one of his best seasons as a professional, protecting Newton's blind side. Oher played in 98.4% of the team's snaps, allowed a career-low four sacks—tied for eighth-fewest in the league—and was penalized only three times for 25 yards.

On February 7, 2016, Oher was part of the Panthers team that played in Super Bowl 50. In the game, the Panthers fell to the Denver Broncos by a score of 24–10.

On June 17, 2016, Oher signed a three-year contract extension with the Panthers worth $21.6 million with $9.5 million guaranteed. Oher was placed on injured reserve on November 25, 2016, with a concussion—having played in only three games during the 2016 season.

On July 20, 2017, Oher was released by the Panthers after a failed physical.

Books
Oher is one of the subjects of Michael Lewis's 2006 book, The Blind Side: Evolution of a Game. Before the book was published, excerpts appeared in The New York Times Magazine as "The Ballad of Big Mike". His portion of the book was adapted for film and was directed by John Lee Hancock. The Blind Side was released in the United States on November 20, 2009. The movie stars Quinton Aaron as Michael Oher, alongside Sandra Bullock and Tim McGraw. The movie was nominated for Academy Awards for both Best Picture and Best Actress for Bullock. Bullock won an Oscar for her portrayal of Leigh Anne Tuohy.

Oher wrote his autobiography, I Beat the Odds: From Homelessness to The Blind Side and Beyond, in 2011.

Personal life
Oher began dating Tiffany Roy after first meeting at the University of Mississippi. They went on to have four children together; two sons and two daughters. The couple got engaged on July 21, 2021, and married on November 5, 2022 in Nashville, Tennessee. At the time of their marriage, the couple had been together for 17 years.

References

External links

Profile of Michael Oher and an excerpt from Michael Lewis's The Blind Side at NPR.org
Profile (archived) at Carolina Panthers's website
Profile (archived) at Tennessee Titans' website
Profile (archived) at Baltimore Ravens' website

1986 births
Living people
21st-century Christians
African-American Christians
African-American players of American football
All-American college football players
American adoptees
American football offensive guards
American football offensive tackles
Baltimore Ravens players
Carolina Panthers players
Ole Miss Rebels football players
Players of American football from Tennessee
Tennessee Titans players
Tuohy family
21st-century African-American sportspeople
20th-century African-American people